The 1989 IIHF European U18 Championship was the twenty-second playing of the IIHF European Junior Championships.

Group A
Played April 2–10, 1989 in Kyiv, USSR.

First round 
Group 1

Group 2

Final round 
Championship round

7th place

Romania was relegated to Group B for 1990

Tournament Awards
Top Scorer  Robert Reichel (21 points)-A tournament Record
Top Goalie: Sergei Tkachenko
Top Defenceman:Jiří Vykoukal
Top Forward: Pavel Bure

Group B
Played March 17–23, 1989 in Klagenfurt, Austria.

First round 
Group 1

Group 2

Final round
Championship round

Placing round

Poland was promoted to Group A and Bulgaria was relegated to Group C, for 1990.

Group C
Played March 25–30, 1989 in Puigcerdá, Spain.

Spain was promoted to Group B for 1990.

References

Complete results

Junior
IIHF European Junior Championship tournament
IIHF European U18 Championship
1980s in Kyiv
Sports competitions in Kyiv
1989 in Ukraine
Junior
March 1989 sports events in Europe
Sports competitions in Klagenfurt
International ice hockey competitions hosted by the Soviet Union
International ice hockey competitions hosted by Spain
International ice hockey competitions hosted by Austria
Junior
Junior